Philadelphia Merchant Ship F.C. was a short-lived U.S. soccer team of the early twentieth century.  It spent two seasons in the National Association Football League and went to the semifinals of the 1919 American Cup.

History
Philadelphia Merchant Ship was the company team for the W. Averell Harriman’s Shipbuilding Company located on the Delaware River near Philadelphia, Pennsylvania.  The team exploded onto the national scene in 1918.  That year it entered the National Association Football League, finishing tied for second with Paterson F.C., but defeated them in a run off game to take sole possession of second place.  That summer, the company entered two teams, Merchant Ship “A” and Merchant Ship “B” in the National Challenge Cup.  Both were eliminated in the second round.  However, Merchant Ship “A” went to the semifinals of the American Cup before falling to Paterson F.C. and Merchant Ship “B” won the Allied Amateur Cup.  The team experienced an immediate drop off in performance the next season, finishing ninth in the NAFBL standings.  The team withdrew from the league at the end of the season and disbanded.

Year-by-year

Honors
League Championship
 Runner Up (1):  1919

External links
 National Association Football League standings

References

Defunct soccer clubs in Pennsylvania
National Association Football League teams
Mer
1920 disestablishments in Pennsylvania
Association football clubs disestablished in 1920
Works soccer clubs in the United States